"I Hate This Part" is a song by American girl group the Pussycat Dolls from their second album, Doll Domination (2008). The song was written by Wayne Hector, Lucas Secon, Jonas Jeberg, Mich Hansen and produced by the latter two along with Ron Fair and Nicole Scherzinger. It was initially recorded for Scherzinger's planned solo project, Her Name is Nicole, but after its cancellation the song was placed in the group's second album. "I Hate This Part" was released on October 14, 2008, as the second international single and impacted contemporary hit radio stations on October 20, 2008, as the fourth single in the United States by Interscope Records. "I Hate This Part" is a dance/R&B-influenced pop ballad which ditches the Pussycat Dolls's usual sexual image in favor of introspection. Lyrically, the song is about the conversation before a breakup.

Contemporary music critics wrote generally positive reviews, commending the song's production and Scherzinger's vocals. "I Hate This Part" became a moderate success and peaked at number eleven on the US Billboard Hot 100 chart and topped the US Hot Dance Club Songs chart. It also reached the top ten in Australia, France, and New Zealand. A music video for the song directed by Joseph Kahn was filmed in late September 2008. It features the group at a desert with each member on a separate set exploring different emotional sides while choreographed routines were performed at the chorus. "I Hate This Part" was performed on various occasions including the 2008 American Music Awards and throughout their Doll Domination Tour (2009).

Background and composition 
"I Hate This Part" was written by Wayne Hector, Lucas, Jonas Jeberg and Mich Hansen and produced by the latter two along with Ron Fair and Nicole Scherzinger who also served as the song's vocal producer. During an interview with HitQuarters, Hector discussed how "I Hate This Part" was written and composed within an hour. He asked Jeberg to play the piano while he would sing a line. Although it started as ballad, Lucas Secon conceived the idea of turning it into "an up-tempo or a mid-tempo and the title and the concept of the song." The song was recorded at the Cutfather Studios in Copenhagen, Denmark and at The Boiler Room in Santa Monica, California by Mike "Angry" Eleopoulos, Tal Herzber and Jeberg with the assistance from Johnathan Merritt. It was later mixed by Peter Mokran and Eric Weaver at Conway Studios in Hollywood, California. All instrumentation and programming was carried out by Jeberg. While recording the song, Scherzinger was inspired by English rock singer Sting and American rock singer Steve Perry. While Scherzinger was working on her solo album, she recorded around 100 songs for Her Name is Nicole. Following the cancellation of the solo project, a number of tracks including "I Hate This Part" were added to the track list of Doll Domination. "I Hate This Part" was released on October 14, 2008, as the second international single and impacted contemporary hit radio stations on October 20, 2008, as the fourth single in the United States. Sal Cinquemani of Slant Magazine noted that "I Hate This Part" would have made a better follow-up to "When I Grow Up" "dousing [its] campfire with its more adult sound like the way 'Stickwitu' did following 'Don't Cha' in 2005."

"I Hate This Part" is a pop ballad with influences of R&B and dance music. Instrumentation consists of a mournful piano, faux strings and syncopated rhythms. The song also features  dubbing drum loops similar to Kylie Minogue's "All I See" (2008) and Jordin Sparks' "One Step at a Time" (2008). It's written in the key of F major with a time signature in common time and a tempo of 112 beats per minute and uses a simple chord progression of D4—F(add 9)—C—B♭2. Jamie Gill from Yahoo Music UK described Scherzinger's vocals as "breathless" and understated, while David Balls of Digital Spy noted the high levels of emotion on her vocals. Scherzinger uses a vocal range from F3 – F5. In the song the group goes to an even more streamlined pop approach. It's one of the several songs of Doll Domination that ditch the Doll's usual sexual image in favor of a more "introspective, sad, lonely girl approach." Lyrically the song is about the conversation before the breakup. The ending was described as a "tear soaked vocal outro".

Critical response 
"I Hate This Part" received mostly positive reviews from critics. Jordan Richardson of Blogcritics praised Scherzinger's calling it "a truly powerful and punchy performance." He ended the review writing "It’s the best PCD song ever." Nathan Rabin from The A.V. Club praised the song for being a "haunting and affecting break-up song that captures the sense of exhaustion and resignation that comes with finally putting a dying romantic relationship out its misery." Nick Levine of Digital Spy described the song as "wonderfully melodramatic". David Balls from the same publication gave the song three out of five stars praising the song's production and Scherzinger's vocals. Elan Priya of The Times wrote that "I Hate This Part" and "Whatcha Think About That" are exceptions from an album that "lacks any distinct personality." Sal Cinquemani of Slant Magazine praised the songwriting. Spence D. in a review for the entertainment website IGN lauded certain elements of the song "such as the mournful piano and the tear soaked vocal outro" but argued that certain parts "are a bit earnest." Rudy Klapper of Sputnikmusic described the song as "ubiquitous" but noted the album's ballads are "noteworthy only for their uncanny resemblance to numerous other radio hits [...] as poor attempts to diversify the group’s sound." In the annual Pazz and Jop mass critics poll of the year's best in music in 2009, "I Hate This Part" was ranked at number 546. Wayne Hector was recognized by the American Society of Composers, Authors and Publishers (ASCAP) for writing "I Hate This Part".

Chart performance
"I Hate This Part" was a  success in Oceania. In Australia, "I Hate This Part" debuted at number forty-five on the Australian ARIA Singles Chart, based solely on download sales, and has since peaked at number-ten. "I Hate This Part" has been certified Gold by ARIA for sales in excess of 35,000. It reached seven on the physical chart. Two days after debuting in Australia, "I Hate This Part" debuted at number thirty-two on the New Zealand RIANZ Singles Chart, and eventually peaked at number-nine. "I Hate This Part" has been certified Gold by RIANZ for sales in excess of 7,500.

In Europe, the song charted within the top five, top ten and top twenty on most of the charts it entered. It has also peaked at number-four on Billboard's European Hot 100 Singles Chart. In Romania, the single became a considerable hit, and received strong airplay. As a result, the track peaked at number-one, becoming the Pussycat Dolls' third number-one single, after "Don't Cha" and "Wait a Minute". In the United Kingdom the song entered on November 8, 2008, at number thirty-six. On December 6, 2008, it ultimately peaked at number twelve. On February 7, 2009, it fell off the top-forty after a thirteen-week run that saw it bound around the chart but ultimately never peak any higher than number twelve, their first ever hit to miss the top-ten. 
"I Hate This Part" debuted and peaked at number-three on the French Singles Chart, becoming the group's second consecutive top 3 hit, and their second highest-peaking single to date. By doing so it has surpassed the peak position of the group's worldwide hit "Don't Cha" which reached number-six on this chart in 2005.

"I Hate This Part" rose steadily in the United States until it reached its peak of number eleven on the Billboard Hot 100 and number ten on the Billboard Pop 100 following a considerable increase in airplay on 3 formats. "I Hate This Part" also spent two weeks at number one on Billboard's Hot Dance Club Play, becoming the Dolls' fourth single to reach the top of the chart but the first to spend two weeks there. "I Hate This Part" is the only single in the Pussycat Dolls' history that has charted higher in the United States than the United Kingdom (albeit it was only 1 position higher). On March 11, 2010 "I Hate This Part" was certified platinum by RIAA, after a year since it was released.
In Canada, the song debuted at number ninety-three and in following weeks fell to number ninety-six and then to number one-hundred. However it later rebounded up the charts and has since reached a peak position of number five.

Music video 
The music video for "I Hate This Part" directed by Joseph Kahn over a period of two days in late September 2008. Kahn had previously directed "When I Grow Up", the lead single of Doll Domination. In an interview for Rap-Up, Melody Thornton said that her 24th birthday will be spent shooting the video  and unveiled that it would be a desert-themed video. While filming the video Scherzinger explained that they are going to "explore all different emotional sides of this song in making this video."

Synopsis 
The video like any other is mainly focused on Nicole Scherzinger. The video starts with Scherzinger playing the piano to the beat of the song, and images of a book and flowers blowing in the wind. When the first verse begins, it shows Scherzinger singing on the piano while the girls are shown on the road with a broken-down car, waiting for a car to arrive. At the beginning of the chorus, the girls start walking to the beat of music. In the next verse Scherzinger is seen singing in the desert alone, while Jessica Sutta is shown trying to wave down a passing car with her bandanna. All the girls are then shown on top of many broken-down cars during the bridge of the song. During the second chorus, the girls are seen dancing on the sand in sync. In both pre-chorus all the girls are then shown in different elements in the desert: Scherzinger in front of the broken-down car with a wolf, Sutta in a parking lot on top of an arcade machine, Ashley Roberts walking in a parking lot with a pink stuffed elephant-doll, Melody Thornton with a flower, and Kimberly Wyatt in a broken-down pick-up truck. During the climax of the scene, Scherzinger is singing during an incoming storm at night. The girls are then shown in the same scene as before while dancing in sync, but this time, it is raining. The music videos ends with an eruption of emotions from all the girls, climaxing with a clip of Roberts comforting Thornton who is in sadness. The video closes with Scherzinger still playing with the beat of the background on the piano and a butterfly on her hand, before ending with a shot of the rain-soaked girls united in an embrace.

Reception 
John Kordosh of Yahoo! Music negatively commented that the video "shows Nicole pretending to play the piano while the rest of the [Pussycat Dolls] troupe looks good in situations that have nothing to do with anything." MTV Buzzworthy noted that "[Scherzinger's] post-breakup ritual is less skulking-around-the-house and more crazy, desert-style Wet T-shirt contest." Nick Levine from Digital Spy, wrote that:
"[the] video is a less racy affair than usual, though the girls do get to flash some flesh during a dancing-in-the-rain scene at the end." In 2009, the video received a MuchMusic Video nomination for Best International Group Video, but lost to the Black Eyed Peas's music video for "Boom Boom Pow".

Live performances 
The Pussycat Dolls performed the song at the Walmart Soundcheck, along with "When I Grow Up", "Takin' Over the World", "Buttons" and "Don't Cha".  On November 21, they performed a medley of "I Hate This Part" and "When I Grow Up" at the 2008 American Music Awards donning all-rubber outfits. On December 12, the group performed on The Hills Finale Live from NYC.
The group went on to perform on January 7 on The Tonight Show with Jay Leno, on January 18 they performed along with "When I Grow Up" on the 2009 NRJ Music Awards in Cannes, France and on MuchOnDemand on March 18 along with "Jai Ho! (You Are My Destiny)", Nicole Scherzinger performed "I Hate This Part" as part of a Pussycat Dolls medley during her first solo tour, Killer Love Tour (2012).

Track listings 

Digital download
 "I Hate This Part" - 3:38

Remixes - EP
 "I Hate This Part" (Moto Blanco Remix - Club Mix) - 7:47
 "I Hate This Part" (Digital Dog Remix - Club Mix) - 5:50
 "I Hate This Part" (Dave Audé Remix - Club) - 8:18
 "I Hate This Part" (Karmatronic Club Mix) - 6:28

TV Remix - as performed on Wetten Dass TV Show
 "I Hate This Part" (Dave Audé Dance Hybrid Mix) - 3:33
 "Don't Cha Hate This When I Grow Up Medley" (Dave Audé Mix) - 3:35

Remixes France version - EP
 "I Hate This Part" (Dave Audé Remix - Radio) - 3:40
 "I Hate This Part" (Moto Blanco Remix - Radio) - 3:41
 "I Hate This Part" (Karmatronic Club Radio) - 3:25
 "I Hate This Part" (Digital Dog Remix - Club Edit) - 3:05

Credits and personnel 
Credits adapted from the liner notes of Doll Domination 2.0.

Recording
Recorded at Cutfather Studios (Copenhagen, Denmark); The Boiler Room (Santa Monica, California)
Mixed at Conway Studios (Hollywood, California)

Personnel
Mike "Angry" Eleopoulos – recording
Ron Fair – producer, vocal production
Mich "Cutfather" Hansen – songwriter, producer
Wayne Hector – songwriter
Tal Herzberg – recording, Pro Tools
Jonas Jeberg – songwriter, producer, recording, instruments, programming
Lucas Secon – songwriter
Johnathan Merritt – assistant recording
Peter Mokran – mixing
Eric Weaver – mixing assistant
Nicole Scherzinger – vocal production

Charts

Weekly charts

Monthly charts

Year-end charts

Certifications

Release history

See also 
List of number-one singles in Romania
List of number-one dance singles of 2009 (U.S.)

References

External links 

2008 songs
2008 singles
2000s ballads
Contemporary R&B ballads
The Pussycat Dolls songs
Music videos directed by Joseph Kahn
Song recordings produced by Nicole Scherzinger
Songs written by Wayne Hector
Songs written by Lucas Secon
Songs written by Jonas Jeberg
Songs written by Cutfather
Interscope Records singles
Pop ballads
Number-one singles in Romania